Chen Cheng (January 4, 1898 – March 5, 1965) was a Chinese political and military leader, and one of the main commanders of the National Revolutionary Army during the Second Sino-Japanese War and the Chinese Civil War.

After moving to Taiwan at the end of the civil war, he served as the Governor of Taiwan Province, Vice President, and Premier of the Republic of China (ROC). He represented the ROC in visits to the United States and helped to initiate land reforms and tax reduction programs that caused communism to become unattractive in Taiwan since peasants were able to own land.

His courtesy name was Tsyr-shiou.

Early life
Chen Cheng was born in Qingtian County, Zhejiang, graduated from Baoding Military Academy in 1922, and entered Whampoa Military Academy two years later. It was there that he first met Chiang Kai-shek, Commandant of the Academy. Later, Chen joined National Revolutionary Army to participate in the Northern Expedition.

Rise in military
During the Northern Expedition, Chen displayed good leadership ability. Within a year, he was promoted from commanding battalions to divisions already.

After the expedition, Chen became active in the wars against the warlords. His successes in the battles allowed him to be promoted again, to the commander of the 18th Army.

Anticommunist campaigns
In 1931, Chen was assigned the task of suppressing the Red Army. In various campaigns searching for the main force of Red Army, Chen's units experienced heavy casualties. In the fifth campaign against the Communists, he finally managed to defeat them, which forced the Red Army to launch its Long March.

Campaigns against the Red Army came to an end after the Xi'an Incident in which Chiang and his staff were forced to agree to co-operate with the communists against the invading Imperial Japanese Army.

War against Japan

During the Battle of Shanghai, he was one of the top military assistants of Chiang Kai Shek. It was his idea to seek a decisive action in Southern China, rather than confronting the Japanese in Northern China, where Nationalist troops were in poor condition and lacked transporting vehicles. After the fall of Shanghai and of Nanjing, Chen moved to Hubei to command the Battle of Wuhan in 1938. Wuhan was the provisional headquarters of the Chinese Army. The Japanese, however, managed, despite heavy losses to defeat the Chinese and captured Wuhan on October 25, 1938.

In the last years of the war, Chen went on to command in the Battle of Changsha, the Battle of Yichang, and the Battle of West Hubei. In 1943, he was appointed the commander of the Chinese Expeditionary Force in the Burma Theater until he was replaced by Wei Li-huang because of illness.

Chinese Civil War

After the Second Sino-Japanese War, Chen became the Chief of the General Staff and commander-in-chief of the navy. He followed Chiang's orders and began to raid the "liberated" areas of the Red Army, which launched the Chinese Civil War.

In August 1947, Chiang appointed Chen as director of the Northeastern Headquarters to command the Nationalist forces against the Communists in that area. He made the crucial mistake of dissolving the local security regiments because they had served in the Japanese-collaborationist Manchukuo Imperial Army, which made the total Nationalist strength in Manchuria fall from 1.3 million to less than 480,000. He also dismissed some of the most capable Nationalist commanders, such as Du Yuming, Sun Li-jen, Zheng Dongguo, and Chen Mingren. As a result, he suffered a series of major defeats, and Chiang recalled Chen to Nanjing and sent Wei Lihuang to replace him in Shenyang as Commander-in-Chief of the Northeast and Fan Hanjie as deputy commander-in-chief and director of Jinzhou forward command center. Chen took a sick leave in Taiwan to treat his chronic stomach ailment.

In Taiwan

Chiang appointed Chen as the Governor of Taiwan Province in 1949 to plan the development of Taiwan as a Nationalist stronghold. After the Nationalist force retreated to Taiwan, Chen went on to hold key civilian government positions such as Vice-Executive of the Kuomintang, Vice President, and Premier of the Republic of China. He was the youngest premier since promulgation of the 1947 constitution to take office.

In his years on Taiwan, he introduced various land and economic reforms and carried out the reconstruction of Taiwan. Chen's 37.5% Arable Rent Reduction initiative was credited with stopping the spread of communism in Taiwan. The policy capped the rent farmers paid to landlords at 37.5% of the harvest. Prior to the directive, landlords had often sought more than half of the crop as payment.

He was also credited with launching several construction projects. One was the Shimen Reservoir, in Taoyuan County, which reduced flooding and increased the rice crop production.

On May 19, 1949, Chen promulgated the Order of Martial Law to announce the imposition of martial law throughout Taiwan to expel communist infiltration and to buffer defense capabilities.

Death

Chen died of hepatic tumors in 1965. His cremated remains were moved to Fo Guang Shan, Kaohsiung County (now part of Kaohsiung City), in August 1995.

Honors
 Key to the City
 Manila, Philippines (March 20, 1960)
 Pasay City, Philippines (March 20, 1960)

References

Citations

Sources 

 Dupuy, Trevor N. Harper Encyclopedia of Military Biography, New York, 1992
 generals.dk: Chen Chengs military timeline
Ministry of National Defense R.O.C 
US Naval War College "Handbook for the Chinese Civil War"
 https://web.archive.org/web/20090326011824/http://cgsc.leavenworth.army.mil/carl/download/csipubs/bjorge_huai.pdf

External links 
 

1898 births
1965 deaths
Politicians from Lishui
People from Qingtian County
People of the Northern Expedition
Chinese military personnel of World War II
Chinese anti-communists
National Revolutionary Army generals from Zhejiang
Vice presidents of the Republic of China on Taiwan
Premiers of the Republic of China on Taiwan
Kuomintang politicians in Taiwan
Whampoa Military Academy alumni
Recipients of the Order of Blue Sky and White Sun
Republic of China politicians from Zhejiang
Chairpersons of the Taiwan Provincial Government
Chinese Civil War refugees
Taiwanese people from Zhejiang